Bleed the Fifth is the debut studio album by American metal band Divine Heresy, released in August 2007. It sold approximately 2,700 copies in its first week of release. The album name is a play on the American judicial system Fifth Amendment (To plead the Fifth Amendment). It is the only album to feature original vocalist Tommy Vext who later departed from the band after an on-stage altercation.

"Failed Creation" served as the album's lead single. Its music video received airplay on MTV2's Headbangers Ball upon release.

Track listing 
All lyrics written by Tommy Vext.

Credits
Divine Heresy
Tommy Vext – vocals
Dino Cazares – guitars, bass
Tim Yeung – drums

Guest
Tony Campos – bass on "Rise of the Scorned" and "Closure"
Nicholas Barker – drums on "Rise of the Scorned"
Logan Mader – additional guitars on "Rise of the Scorned", "Royal Blood Heresy", and "Closure"
Marc Rizzo – acoustic guitars on "Rise of the Scorned"

Release history

References 

2007 debut albums
Divine Heresy albums
Century Media Records albums
Roadrunner Records albums
Albums produced by Logan Mader